Kargino (Qarğa; , Korakjal) is a rural locality (a village) in Kayrakovsky Selsoviet, Mishkinsky District, Bashkortostan, Russia. The population was 556 as of 2010. There are 6 streets.

Geography 
Kargino is located 27 km northwest of Mishkino (the district's administrative centre) by road. Andreyevka is the nearest rural locality.

References 

Rural localities in Mishkinsky District